Dorycnopsis is a genus of flowering plants in the legume family Fabaceae. It belongs to the subfamily Faboideae.

Accepted species in the genus include:

References

Loteae
Fabaceae genera
Taxa named by Pierre Edmond Boissier